Secunderabad station may refer to:

 Secunderabad East metro station, a metro station on the Hyderabad Metro Blue Line
 Secunderabad Junction railway station, an Indian Railways station in Hyderabad
 Secunderabad West metro station, a metro station on the Hyderabad Metro Green Line